The President of the Western Australian Legislative Council, also known as the Presiding Officer of the Council, is the presiding officer of the Western Australian Legislative Council, the upper house of the Parliament of Western Australia. The position is analogous to that of the President of the Australian Senate.

The role of the president
The President is always a Member of the Western Australian Legislative Council, and is the ceremonial head of that Council.  The President therefore performs ceremonial duties, and represents the Council to other organisations.  In conjunction with the Speaker of the Western Australian Legislative Assembly, the President is responsible for the administration of the Western Australian Parliament.  When the Council is sitting, the President enforces procedures, maintains order, puts questions after debate and ensures each member of the chamber gets a fair opportunity to speak to matters under debate. The President also makes decisions and formal rulings with regards to the chamber's standing orders.

Election of the president
The President of the Legislative Council is elected by the other members of the Council in accordance with Section 49 of the Constitution Act 1889. They must be elected after each general election or upon the death, resignation or removal of a previous President, and can be brought down by a vote of the chamber's members (although this has never happened in Western Australia), so must maintain the confidence of the chamber.

List of presidents of the Legislative Council
Note: where no political party is listed, this means that either the party is unknown, or that the President in question was not affiliated with any particular party.  Multiple parties are listed in cases where the President represented more than one party over their career as a Member of the Legislative Council.

See also

 Speaker of the Western Australian Legislative Assembly

References
 

Western Australia